Blinkity Blank is a 1955 animated short film created by Norman McLaren for the National Film Board of Canada. It won, among other awards, both the Short Film Palme d'Or at Cannes and the BAFTA Award for Best Animated Film.

Production
Engraved directly onto black film leader, Blinkity Blank features a soundtrack combining improvisational jazz from composer Maurice Blackburn along with graphical sounds created by McLaren scratching onto the film's optical soundtrack.

The film features lines, dots and other abstract forms, along with fruits, trees, planets and chickens—the latter featured at length in another McLaren hand-drawn film Hen Hop—which blink in and out of existence, or merge with or modulate other shapes. McLaren also left some frames blank, which he described as "sprinkling on the empty band of time".

Awards
 Cannes Film Festival, Cannes: Short Film Palme d'Or, 1955 
  9th British Academy Film Awards, London: BAFTA Award for Best Animated Film, 1956
 Berlin International Film Festival, Berlin: Silver Bear, 1955
 Franco-American International Film Festival, Paris: Fourth Prize, 1955
 Edinburgh International Film Festival, Edinburgh: Diploma of Merit, 1955
 Cape Town International Film Festival, Cape Town: Certificate of Merit, Documentary, 1955
 Durban International Film Festival, Durban: Certificate of Merit, Documentary, 1955
 SODRE International Festival of Documentary and Experimental Films, Montevideo: First Honourable Mention, Experimental Films, 1956

References

External links

1955 films
Films directed by Norman McLaren
National Film Board of Canada animated short films
Drawn-on-film animated films
Animated films without speech
Short Film Palme d'Or winners
BAFTA winners (films)
Jazz films
Visual music
Graphical sound
1950s animated short films
1955 animated films
Animated musical films
Canadian animated short films
Quebec films
1950s Canadian films